The 1998 Akron Zips football team represented Akron University in the 1998 NCAA Division I-A football season as members of the Mid-American Conference. They were led by fourth–year head coach Lee Owens. The Zips played their home games at the Rubber Bowl in Akron, Ohio. They finished the season with a record of 4–7, 3–6 in MAC play to finish in fifth place in the East Division.

Schedule

References

Akron
Akron Zips football seasons
Akron Zips football